Charles Ervin Bloedorn Jr. (May 28, 1912 – May 20, 1998) was an American professional basketball player. He played for the Akron Goodyear Wingfoots in the National Basketball League from 1937 to 1940.

Bloedorn also played one season of minor league baseball, for the Louisville Colonels in 1934.

References

1912 births
1998 deaths
Akron Goodyear Wingfoots players
American men's basketball players
Basketball coaches from Illinois
Basketball players from Chicago
College men's basketball players in the United States
Guards (basketball)
Illinois Institute of Technology alumni
Louisville Colonels (minor league) players